Mogrus dalmasi is a species of jumping spider in the genus Mogrus that lives in Mali. The female was first described in 1941.

References

Salticidae
Spiders of Africa
Spiders described in 1941